Benjamin Fay Mills (June 4, 1857 – May 1, 1916) was an American evangelist preacher, vegetarianism activist and writer.

Biography

Mills was born at Rahway, New Jersey in 1857. His father, Thornton A. Mills was a Presbyterian minister and son of Benjamin Mills from Kentucky. He obtained his B.A. from Lake Forest University in 1879 and M.A. in 1881. He married Mary Russell in 1879 and the following year became an ordained pastor of the Congregational church at Rutland, Vermont. From 1879 to 1881 he was a missionary in the Black Hills of Dakota. He was pastor of the Reformed Church of Greenwich, New York from 1881 to 1883. He was an evangelist preacher from 1886 to 1897 and conducted meetings throughout the United States. Mills is alleged to have converted 500,000 people to Christianity in ten years. He withdrew from the Congregational church in 1897. He became minister of the First Unitarian Church of Oakland in 1889. He held that position until 1903.

In the 1890s he was influenced by George D. Herron and developed a social interpretation of the gospel. In 1893, the Iowa College offered Mills the Doctor of Divinity but he declined it. Mills moved to Los Angeles and lectured on liberal religion. He was the founder and minister of the Los Angeles Fellowship (1904–1911) and the Chicago Fellowship (1911–1914).

Mills was inspired by Swami Vivekananda and stated that "this man altered my life". Mills was responsible for inviting Vivekananda to Oakland. For example, Mills paid for Vivekananda's travel fare and set up big crowds for him to preach to. Mills and his wife took interest in reading Vivekananda's works. In 1900, Vivekananda gave seven lectures at the First Unitarian Church of Oakland. Mills described Vivekananda as "a man of gigantic intellect, indeed, one to whom our greatest university professors were as mere children."

Mill's religious interests went through many different phases. In 1907, he presented a series of five discourses on the Bhagavad Gita in Chicago, Denver,
Los Angeles and Portland. In 1915, he went through a reconversion to the Christian faith and was received into the Chicago Presbytery. Mills had six children. Mills was an ethical vegetarian who supported animal rights and Christian socialism. He died at Grand Rapids, Michigan in 1916.

Selected publications

Power From On High (1890)
A Message to Mothers (1892)
Victory Through Surrender (1892)
God's World and Other Sermons (1893)
The Ministry of the Nations to One Another (1895)
Address of Rev. Benjamin Fay Mills (1897)
Twentieth Century Religion (1898)
Why I Am a Vegetarian (1903) 
A Strong Argument (1904)
The Divine Adventure (1905)
Why I Changed My Religious Opinions (1908)
An Evangelist's Views on Health Building (1914)
Why I Return to the Church (1915)

References

Further reading

Constance P. Murray. (2011). From Individual Salvation to Social Salvation: Why Evangelist B. Fay Mills Changed His Revival Message. James Madison University.

1857 births
1916 deaths
American animal rights activists
American Christian socialists
American Christian writers
American Congregationalists
American evangelists
American vegetarianism activists
Lake Forest College alumni
People from Rahway, New Jersey